Utalgi (also, Utal’gi, Kishlak and Utalghy-Akhtarma) is a village in the Absheron Rayon of Azerbaijan.

References 

Populated places in Absheron District